USS Bastian (CVE-37) (originally AVG-37 and then ACV-37) was a Bogue-class escort aircraft carrier built by Seattle-Tacoma Shipbuilding of Tacoma, Washington, laid down on 25 August 1942 and launched 15 December 1942. She was transferred to the United Kingdom, under Lend-Lease and commissioned on 4 August 1943 as the Ruler-class escort carrier HMS Trumpeter (D09).

On 4 May 1945 aircraft of 846 Naval Air Squadron flew from Trumpeter to take part in Operation Judgement, an attack on the U-boat depot at Kilbotn, Norway, contributing eight Grumman Avengers and four Grumman Wildcats to a 44-aircraft attack that destroyed several vessels including the depot ship "Black Watch" and U-711.

Trumpeter was returned to United States' custody 6 April 1946, stricken from the Naval Vessel Register 19 June 1946 and sold into merchant service as Alblasserdijk (later renamed Irene Valmas).  She was sold for scrap in Spain in 1971.

Design and description
These ships were all larger and had a greater aircraft capacity than all the preceding American built escort carriers. They were also all laid down as escort carriers and not converted merchant ships.

Armament comprised: two 4"/50, 5"/38 or 5"/51 Dual Purpose guns in single mounts, sixteen 40 mm Bofors anti-aircraft guns in twin mounts and twenty 20 mm Oerlikon anti-aircraft cannons in single mounts. They had a maximum aircraft capacity of twenty-four aircraft which could be a mixture of Grumman Martlet, Vought F4U Corsair or Hawker Sea Hurricane fighter aircraft and Fairey Swordfish or Grumman Avenger anti-submarine aircraft.

Notes

References

The Attack on 'Black Watch' (Harald Isachsen, Harstad, 2009,   -  in Norwegian)

External links

 

Ships built in Tacoma, Washington
1942 ships
 
Ruler-class escort carriers